Somani is a village development committee in Nawalparasi District in the Lumbini Zone of southern Nepal. At the time of the 1991 Nepal census it had a population of 5202 people living in 783 individual households.

References

Populated places in Parasi District